National Highway 911, commonly referred to as NH 911 is a national highway in India. It is a spur road of National Highway 11.  NH-911 runs in the state of Rajasthan in India. The route of national highway 911 was further extended to Sri Ganganagar in Rajasthan.

Route 
NH911 connects Bap, Naukh, Bikampur, Charanwala, Ranjitpura, Goru(Godu), R.D.95, Gokul, Dandkala, Jaggasar, Dantour, Pugal, Sattasar, chhattargarh, Rojhri, Gharsana, Anupgarh, Raisinghnagar, Gajsinghpur, padampur, karanpur and Sadhuwali(Sri Ganganagar) in the state of Rajasthan.

Junctions  
 
  Terminal near Bap.
 
  Terminal near Sadhuwali (Sri Ganganagar).

See also 
 List of National Highways in India
 List of National Highways in India by state

References

External links 

 NH 911 on OpenStreetMap

National highways in India
National Highways in Rajasthan